Centipedes (from New Latin , "hundred", and Latin , "foot") are predatory arthropods belonging to the class Chilopoda (Ancient Greek ,  kheilos, lip, and New Latin suffix , "foot", describing the forcipules) of the subphylum Myriapoda, an arthropod group which includes millipedes and other multi-legged animals. Centipedes are elongated segmented (metameric) creatures with one pair of legs per body segment. All centipedes are venomous and can inflict painful bites, injecting their venom through pincer-like appendages known as forcipules. Despite the name, no centipede has exactly 100 pairs of legs; they can have a varying number of legs, ranging from 30 to 382.  Like spiders and scorpions, centipedes are predominantly carnivorous.

Worldwide, an estimated 8,000 species of centipedes are thought to exist, of which 3,000 have been described. Centipedes have a wide geographical range, even reaching  beyond the Arctic Circle. They are found in an array of terrestrial habitats from tropical rainforests to deserts. Within these habitats, centipedes require a moist microhabitat because they lack the waxy cuticle of insects and arachnids, therefore causing them to rapidly lose water. Accordingly, they are found in soil and leaf litter, under stones and dead wood, and inside logs. Centipedes are among the largest terrestrial invertebrate predators, and often contribute significantly to the invertebrate predatory biomass in terrestrial ecosystems.

Physical description 

Centipedes have a rounded or flattened head, bearing a pair of antennae at the forward margin. They have a pair of elongated mandibles, and two pairs of maxillae. The first pair of maxillae form the lower lip, and bear short palps. The first pair of limbs stretch forward from the body to cover the remainder of the mouth. These limbs, or forcipules, end in sharp claws and include venom glands that help the animal to kill or paralyze its prey. It is known to prey on other invertebrates including tarantulas and scorpions, as well as lizards, frogs, birds, mice, and even bats, catching them in midflight.

Centipedes can be found in a wide variety of environments. They normally have a drab coloration combining shades of brown and red. Cavernicolous (cave-dwelling) and subterranean species may lack pigmentation, while many tropical scolopendromorphs have bright aposematic colors.

Sensory organs 

Many species of centipedes lack eyes, but some possess a variable number of ocelli, which are sometimes clustered together to form true compound eyes. However, these eyes are only capable of discerning light from dark, and provide no true vision. In some species, the first pair of legs (at the centipede's head-end) can function as sensory organs, similar to antennae; unlike the antennae of most other invertebrates, these point backwards. An unusual clustering of sensory organs (found in some centipedes) is the Organ of Tömösváry. Located at the base of the antennae, these consist of a disc-like structure and a central pore, with an encircling of sensitive cells. They are likely used for sensing vibrations, and may even provide a weak form of “hearing”.

Forcipules 

Forcipules are a unique feature found only in centipedes, and no other arthropods. The forcipules are modifications of the first pair of legs (the maxillipeds), forming a pincer-like appendage, always located just behind the head. Forcipules are not actual oral mouthparts, though they are used in the subduing of prey animals, notably for injecting venom and holding on to their victims. Venom glands run through a tube, from inside the head to the tip of each forcipule.

Body 

Behind the head, the body consists of at least fifteen segments. Most of the segments bear a single pair of legs; the maxillipeds project forward, from the first body segment, with the final two segments being small and legless. Each pair of legs are slightly longer than the pair preceding them, ensuring that they do not overlap, thus reducing the chance that they will collide with each other, tripping the animal while in motion. In some cases, the last pair of legs may be twice the length of the first pair. The final segment bears a telson, and includes the openings of the reproductive organs.

As predators, centipedes mainly use their antennae to seek out their prey. The digestive tract forms a simple tube, with digestive glands attached to the mouthparts. Like insects, centipedes breathe through a tracheal system, typically with a single opening, or spiracle, on each body segment. They excrete waste through a single pair of malpighian tubules.

Ultimate legs 

Just as the first pair of legs are modified into forcipules, the back legs are modified into "ultimate legs", the use of which varies between species but do not help with locomotion. The ultimate legs may be elongated and thin, thickened, or pincer-like. The ultimate legs are frequently sexually dimorphic, and may play a role in mating rituals. Because glandular pores occur more frequently on ultimate legs then on other "walking" legs, they may also serve a sensory role. They are also sometimes used in defensive postures, and some species even use them to capture prey, defend themselves against predators, or suspend themselves from objects such as branches, using the legs as pincers. Many species have been recorded raising and splaying their ultimate legs and displaying the spines found on the legs as a defensive posture.

Several species have also been observed using their ultimate legs upon encountering another centipede, trying to grab the body of the other centipede with its ultimate legs. This position may be held for several minutes, and sometimes up to half an hour.

Members of the genus Alipes can stridulate their leaf-like ultimate legs to distract or threaten predators. Rhysida immarginata togoensis makes a faint creaking sound when it swings its ultimate legs.

Ultimate legs are also known as anal legs, caudal legs, and terminal legs.

Distinction from millipedes 

The difference between millipedes and centipedes is a common question from the general public. Both groups of myriapods have long, multi-segmented bodies, many legs, a single pair of antennae, and the presence of postantennal organs. Centipedes have one pair of legs per segment, while millipedes have two. Their heads differ in that millipedes have short, elbowed antennae, a pair of robust mandibles and a single pair of maxillae fused into a lip; centipedes have long, threadlike antennae, a pair of small mandibles, two pairs of maxillae and a pair of large venom claws.

Lifecycle

Centipede reproduction does not involve copulation. Males deposit a spermatophore for the female to take up. In temperate areas, egg laying occurs in spring and summer, but in subtropical and tropical areas, little seasonality to centipede breeding is apparent. A few species of parthenogenetic centipedes are known.

The Lithobiomorpha and Scutigeromorpha lay their eggs singly in holes in the soil, and the female fills the holes with soil and leaves them. The number of eggs laid ranges from about 10 to 50. Time of development of the embryo to hatching is highly variable and may take from one to a few months. Time of development to reproductive period is highly variable within and among species. For example, it can take 3 years for S. coleoptrata to achieve adulthood, whereas under the right conditions, lithobiomorph species may reach a reproductive period in 1 year.

Centipedes are relatively long-lived when compared to insects. For example, the European Lithobius forficatus may live for 5 to 6 years, and the wide-ranging Scolopendra subspinipes can live for over 10 years. The combination of a small number of eggs laid, long gestation period, and long time of development to reproduction has led authors to label lithobiomorph centipedes as K-selected.

Females of the Geophilomorpha and Scolopendromorpha show far more parental care. The eggs, 15 to 60 in number, are laid in a nest in the soil or in rotten wood. The female stays with the eggs, guarding and cleaning them to protect them from fungi. The female in some species stays with the young after they have hatched, guarding them until they are ready to leave. If disturbed, the female either abandons the eggs or eats them; abandoned eggs tend to fall prey to fungi rapidly. Some species of Scolopendromorpha are matriphagic, meaning the offspring eat their mother.

Little is known of the life history of the Craterostigmomorpha.

Anamorphy vs. epimorphy

Centipedes grow their legs at different points in their development. In the primitive condition, exhibited by the Lithobiomorpha, Scutigeromorpha, and Craterostigmomorpha, development is anamorphic: more pairs of legs are grown between moults. For example, Scutigera coleoptrata, the house centipede, hatches with only four pairs of legs and in successive moults has 5, 7, 9, 11, 15, 15, 15 and 15 pairs respectively, before becoming a sexually mature adult. Life stages with fewer than 15 pairs of legs are called larval stadia (there are about five stages). After the full complement of legs is achieved, the now postlarval stadia (about five more stages) develop gonopods, sensory pores, more antennal segments, and more ocelli. All mature lithobiomorph centipedes have 15 leg-bearing segments. The Craterostigmomorpha only have one phase of anamorphosis, with embryos having 12 pairs, and moultees 15.

The clade Epimorpha, consisting of the orders Geophilomorpha and Scolopendromorpha, exhibits epimorphy: all pairs of legs are developed in the embryonic stages, and offspring do not develop more legs between moults. This clade contains the longest centipedes; the maximum number of thoracic segments may also vary intraspecifically, often on a geographical basis; in most cases, females bear more legs than males. The number of leg-bearing segments varies widely in the class Chilopoda, from 15 to 191, but the developmental mode of their creation means they are always added in pairs—hence the total number of pairs is always odd.

Ecology

Diet 

Centipedes are predominantly generalist predators, which means they have adapted to eat a variety of different available prey. Examination of centipede gut contents suggests that plant material is an unimportant part of their diets, although centipedes have been observed to eat vegetable matter when starved during laboratory experiments.

What centipedes actually eat is not well known because of their cryptic lifestyles and thorough mastication of food. Laboratory feeding trials suggest that they feed as generalists, taking almost anything that is soft-bodied and in a reasonable size range.

Earthworms may provide the bulk of diets for geophilomorphs, since they burrow through the soil and earthworm bodies would be easily pierced by their venomous claws. Geophilomorphs probably cannot subdue earthworms larger than themselves, so smaller earthworms may be a substantial proportion of their diet.

Scolopendromorphs, given their size, are able to feed on vertebrates, in addition to invertebrates. Three species (Scolopendra cataracta, S. paradoxa, and S. alcyona) are amphibious, and are believed to hunt aquatic or amphibious invertebrates.

Predators & defence 

Many larger animals prey upon centipedes, such as mongooses, mice, salamanders, beetles and snakes. They form an important item of diet for many species and the staple diet of some such as the African ant Amblyopone pluto, which feeds solely on geophilomorph centipedes, and the South African Cape black-headed snake Aparallactus capensis.

Besides their speed and venomous forcipules, some centipedes are capable of secreting sticky, toxic secretions to defend themselves. This capability is present in Geophilomorph, Lithobiomorph, and Scolopendromorph centipedes, where the defensive glands that produce the substance are known as sternal, telepodal, and hydrogen-cyanide-producing glands, respectively.

The secretions contain proteins, as well as hydrogen cyanide, and are used to defend the centipede and even entangle predators. The glands contain two different substances that are mixed together upon release. The glue-like substance that is secreted hardens within a few seconds. The glands are located along the length of the body near the legs.

Habitat & behaviour 

Water regulation is an important aspect of centipede ecology, since they lose water rapidly in dry conditions and are found in moist microhabitats. Water loss is a result of centipedes lacking a waxy covering of their exoskeleton and excreting waste nitrogen as ammonia, which requires extra water. Centipedes deal with water loss through a variety of adaptations. Geophilomorphs lose water less rapidly than lithobiomorphs, though they have a greater surface area to volume ratio. This may be because geophilomorphs have a more heavily sclerotized pleural membrane. Spiracle shape, size, and ability to constrict also have an influence on rate of water loss. In addition, the number and size of coxal pores may be variables affecting centipede water balance.

Centipedes live in many different habitat types—forest, savannah, prairie, and desert, to name a few. Some geophilomorphs are adapted to littoral habitats, where they feed on barnacles.

Species of all orders excluding the Craterostigmomorpha have adapted to caves. Centipede densities have been recorded as high as 600/m2 and biomass as high as 500 mg/m2 wet weight. Small geophilomorphs attain highest densities, followed by small lithobiomorphs. Large lithobiomorphs attain densities of 20/m2.

One study of scolopendromorphs records Scolopendra morsitans in a Nigerian savannah at a density of 0.16/m2 and a biomass of 140 mg/m2 wet weight.

Centipedes are mostly nocturnal. Studies on their activity rhythms confirm this, although a few observations of centipedes active during the day have been made, and one species, Strigamia chinophila, is diurnal.

Threatened species 
As of the 2019 IUCN Red List, there are two vulnerable and one Endangered species of centipede: the Serpent Island Centipede (Scolopendra abnormis), Turk's Earth Centipede (Nothogeophilus turki), and the Seychelles long-legged centipede (Seychellonema gerlachi), the first two of which are vulnerable and the last endangered.

Evolution

Fossil history 

External phylogeny 

The following cladogram shows the position of the Chilopoda within the arthropods as of 2019:

Internal phylogeny 

Within the myriapods, centipedes are believed to be the first of the extant classes to branch from the last common ancestor. The five orders of centipedes are: Craterostigmomorpha, Geophilomorpha, Lithobiomorpha, Scolopendromorpha, and Scutigeromorpha. These orders are united into the clade Chilopoda by the following synapomorphies:

 The first postcephalic appendage is modified to venom claws.
 The embryonic cuticle on second maxilliped has an egg tooth.
 The trochanter–prefemur joint is fixed.
 A spiral ridge occurs on the nucleus of the spermatozoon.

The Chilopoda are then split into two clades: the Notostigmophora including the Scutigeromorpha and the Pleurostigmophora including the other four orders. The main difference is that the Notostigmophora have their spiracles located mid-dorsally. It was previously believed that Chilopoda was split into Anamorpha (Lithobiomorpha and Scutigeromorpha) and Epimorpha (Geophilomorpha and Scolopendromorpha), based on developmental modes, with the relationship of the Craterostigmomorpha being uncertain. Recent phylogenetic analyses using combined molecular and morphological characters supports the previous phylogeny. The Epimorpha still exist as a monophyletic group within the Pleurostigmophora, but the Anamorpha are paraphyletic, as shown in the cladogram:

Developmental constraint 

Geophilomorph centipedes have been used to argue for an evolutionary developmental constraint: that the evolvability of a trait, the number of segments in the case of geophilomorph centipedes, was constrained by the mode of development. The geophilomorph centipedes have variable segment numbers within species, yet as with all centipedes, they always have an odd number of pairs of legs. In this taxon, the number of segments ranges from 27 to 191, but is never an even number.

Evolution of venoms 

All centipedes are venomous. Over the first 50 million years of the clade's evolutionary history, centipede venoms appear to have consisted of a simple cocktail of about four different components, and differentiation into specific venom types appears to have only occurred after the currently recognized five orders had developed. The evolution of the venom includes horizontal gene transfer, involving bacteria, fungi and oomycetes.

Interaction with humans

As food 

As a food item, certain large-sized centipedes are consumed in China, usually skewered and grilled or deep fried. They are often seen in street vendors’ stalls in large cities, including Donghuamen and Wangfujing markets in Beijing.

Large centipedes are steeped in alcohol to make centipede vodka.

Hazards to humans 

Some species of centipedes can be hazardous to humans because of their bite. While a bite to an adult human is usually very painful and may cause severe swelling, chills, fever, and weakness, it is unlikely to be fatal. Bites can be dangerous to small children and those with allergies to bee stings. The venomous bite of larger centipedes can induce anaphylactic shock in such people. Smaller centipedes are generally incapable of piercing human skin.

Even small centipedes that cannot pierce human skin are considered frightening by some humans due to their dozens of legs moving at the same time and their tendency to dart swiftly out of the darkness towards one's feet. A 19th-century Tibetan poet warned his fellow Buddhists, "if you enjoy frightening others, you will be reborn as a centipede."

References

Sources

External links 

 Chilobase, a web resource for Chilopoda taxonomy 
 Debunking of some centipede myths, American Tarantula Society
 Centipedes of Australia
 Chilopoda , Tree of Life Web Project
 What do you call a centipede?

 
Extant Silurian first appearances
Myriapods